Valldemossa is a village and municipality on the island of Majorca, part of the Spanish autonomous community of the Balearic Islands. It is famous for one landmark: the Royal Charterhouse of Valldemossa, built at the beginning of the 14th century, when the mystic and philosopher Ramon Llull lived in this area of Majorca.

Since the 19th century Valldemossa has been promoted internationally as a place of outstanding beauty, largely as a result of the affection of distinguished traveller and cultural writer, the Austrian Archduke Ludwig Salvator.

Valldemossa is a very attractive tourist destination, as it shows early Spanish culture. There are many shops and restaurants to indulge in Spanish culture.

History
In the 1830s the Spanish government confiscated monasteries and the historic estate was sold to private owners, who have since hosted some prominent guests. These have included the Polish composer Frédéric Chopin and his lover the pioneering French writer Amantine-Lucile-Aurore Dupin, better known by her pseudonym George Sand, who wrote a notable account of A Winter in Majorca, describing their 1838–39 visit and praising the island's natural beauty, but criticizing what she perceived as the prejudice and vices of the natives.

Later the Nicaraguan poet Rubén Darío was guest of the Sureda y Montaner families who own the Chartreuse estate. To fight his own nightmares Rubén Dario would sleep in monk habits, however his drinking habits caused a rift with his private hosts and thus his departure from the former monastery and from Majorca.

Also Jorge Luis Borges lived in the town with his parents and his sister Norah, after the First World War let them free from their refuge in Geneva. Borges passionate friendship with the young artist Jacobo Sureda Montaner, son of the painter Pilar Montaner, was decisive for Borges writing mainly in Spanish.

Until the elections of 2007 the town's mayor was the only one in the democratic Kingdom of Spain to remain in office from the times of the Francoist dictatorship, which legally disappeared as the current Spanish Constitution of 1978 was passed.

Valldemossa is the birthplace of Catalina Thomas,  Mallorca's patron saint.

Chopin and Sand in Valldemossa

In October 1836, Chopin met a French writer George Sand (Aurore Dudevant) at Liszt's house. In the summer of 1838, Sand and Chopin became lovers. They spent the following winter from 8 November 1838 to 11 February 1839 together with Sand’s two children in Mallorca. At first, they stayed in Palma de Mallorca and then at the Charterhouse in Valldemossa.

Already after a month, Chopin was writing about Valldemossa in rather sad tones, complaining about the weather and local cuisine. The Mediterranean climate was to agree with the composer; however, that year’s winter was particularly rainy and Chopin caught a cold. On top of that, the piano that was imported from Europe especially for him, was lost during the transport. After the piano was found, it was waiting later for weeks at the Palma port for the duty to be paid. During this time, Chopin was forced to play on a poor Majorcan piano. Despite the difficulties, he was working on his next pieces. It was in Mallorca where the collection of 24 preludes was completed (including prelude in D-flat major nicknamed "Raindrop").

There was not much left after the visit of the couple of lovers. The locals, afraid of tuberculosis, burnt most of the furniture of the rooms Chopin and Sand had lived in. Museums dedicated to the famous couple are located in the monastery cells 2 and 4. Memorabilia collected there include letters and manuscripts, portraits and sketches, as well as the Majorcan piano, on which Chopin had been composing since January 1836. There are also a Chopin's death mask and a lock of his hair, preserved in a George Sand's book. The museum is private and was founded in 1929 by Anne-Marie Boutroux de Ferrà and her husband Bartomeu Ferrà i Juan.

The Chopin Festival organised by Festivals Chopin de Valldemossa has been held since 1930 in August at the Carthusian monastery.

In cell 4, visitors can see the Pleyel piano ordered by the composer in Paris, which arrived in Valldemossa three weeks before his departure. When Chopin and Sand were leaving, they did not want to pay a high duty for the second time and left the piano to the director of the bank where Sand had opened an account. The piano, not yet fully paid off, was probably a form of a settlement. The piano was passed on in the banker’s family from one generation to another. Its current owners are the heirs of the bank director, the Quetglas brothers, who administer Chopin’s and G. Sand’s cell. The instrument is the greatest pride of their Chopin museum.

Tourism
Valldemossa is a very popular tourist destination in the Balearic Islands of Spain. Some main attractions include the 13th century monastery, where the musician Frederic Chopin spent a winter (1838–39). The monastery was originally built as a royal palace, however in 1399 it was converted into a monastery.

Actors Michael Douglas and Catherine Zeta-Jones have a coastal estate near Valldemossa.

Events and festivals
There are many spectacular festivals that take place in Valldemossa, including:
Festes de la Beata: takes place during July 28, celebrates the Patron Saint of Valldemossa. Many parades take place on the streets during this festival.
Festival of Saint Bartomeu: on 24 August, also celebrates the Patron Saint. There are magnificent performances in the Cloisters of the Monastery. 
Annual Artdemossa: this festival, ae the end of July, includes art and performance exhibitions.

Activities
In Valldemossa, one should enjoy the setting in the countryside and the views. However, there are also hikes, cycling, rock climbing, golfing, and horseback riding that is available in the near vicinity.

Restaurants

Mallorcan Cuisine
Ca'n Mario and Es Roquissan are very good options.

Modern Fusion
The restaurant in the hotel Valldemossa is a restaurant where the food is a mixture of Spanish and modern food.

Seafood
For seafood, head down to the Port of Valldemossa.

Gallery

References

External links

Tourist guide Inspirational guide listing much to do and see in Valldemossa
Official website
French text of George Sand's A Winter in Majorca ("Un hiver à Majorque") at the Gutenberg Website
 International Foundation Can Mossenya - Jorge Luis Borges
 The Cell of Chopin and G.Sand

Municipalities in Mallorca
Populated places in Mallorca